Ninja Gaiden Shadow, released in Japan as  and in Europe and Australia as Shadow Warriors, is a side-scrolling action game released for the Game Boy in 1991 by Tecmo.  It is a prequel to the NES Ninja Gaiden trilogy.

Plot
Set three years before the events of the first Ninja Gaiden (NES), the player controls Ryu Hayabusa, who must save New York City from the forces of Emperor Garuda, a servant of Jaquio. Garuda's minions include the cyborg "Spider", kickboxer Gregory and his manager Jack, former military commander Colonel Allen, and the Japanese nobleman .

Gameplay

Ninja Gaiden Shadow features simplified play mechanics compared to those used in the NES trilogy. In contrast to the variety of ninja arts and power-ups available in the NES games, Ryu only has a basic sword attack and a Fire Wheel attack that can be replenished for up to five uses.  While Ryu cannot stick to or climb walls like in the NES games, he can hang onto railings and move underneath them like in Ninja Gaiden III: The Ancient Ship of Doom, and use both his sword attack and the Fire Wheel art while hanging onto railings. Unique to this installment, Ryu is equipped with a grappling hook that allows him to latch onto hard-to-reach railings. Like in the NES versions, Ryu can find health potions, fire wheel stocks, and extra lives by destroying item containers.

Development 
Ninja Gaiden Shadow was originally planned to be a Game Boy adaptation of the NES game Shadow of the Ninja. The Nagoya division of Natsume, which developed Shadow of the Ninja, also developed Ninja Gaiden Shadow.

References

External links
 
Composer information for Ninja Gaiden Shadow at Portable Music History

1991 video games
Game Boy-only games
Natsume (company) games
Ninja Gaiden games
Platform games
Side-scrolling video games
Single-player video games
Video games developed in Japan
Video games scored by Hiroyuki Iwatsuki
Video games set in New York City
Video game spin-offs
Game Boy games